Swings Both Ways is the tenth studio album by English singer-songwriter Robbie Williams. It is his second swing album after 2001's Swing When You're Winning; unlike the latter, which had one original composition, this album features an equal mix of both covers and original material. The album marked Williams' first major work with former longtime collaborator Guy Chambers since 2002's Escapology. Chambers produced the album and co-wrote most of the album's new material with Williams.

The album was released on 15 November 2013 and debuted atop the UK Albums Chart with first-week sales of 109,000 copies, becoming the UK's 1,000th number one album. It was also Williams' eleventh album to top the chart, putting him joint-second with Elvis Presley for the most UK number one albums. Internationally, the album charted strongly and charted in the top 10 in Ireland, Australia, Belgium, Italy and Sweden, in addition to reaching number one in Austria, Croatia, Germany and Switzerland. As of June 2014, the album has sold over 1.6 million copies worldwide.  According to the International Federation of the Phonographic Industry (IFPI), Swings Both Ways was the 18th global best-selling album of 2013.

Background
Swings Both Ways was announced by Williams in September 2013. It was released in the UK by Island Records on 18 November 2013. The album features cover versions of well known songs, as well as six new tracks written by Williams and Guy Chambers, who also produced the album. Swings Both Ways also features duets between Williams and Lily Allen, Michael Bublé, Kelly Clarkson, Olly Murs, and Rufus Wainwright, on both classic and new material.

Williams stated "First of all, I wanted to do a swing album because I wanted to do a swing album. I always knew I'd do another and I think now is the perfect time to do it. I'm enjoying showbiz and I'm enjoying my life and my understanding of where I am now is that there needs to be an event every time I bring out a record. The album this time is a definite ode and a loving glance towards a period on the planet that I was never invited to 'coz I wasn't there… I wanted to be, which I feel still very strongly linked to." He added that Swings Both Ways was originally going to be similar to his first swing album Swing When You're Winning, but he later changed his mind and added the original tracks: "Going in I planned it to be very similar to the last one, and then I realized – that’s actually not what I wanted. It’s different – it’s not all covers, I had some songs that I wanted the world to hear and check out and maybe become part of the fabric of their lives, if I’m lucky enough, that I’ve had a hand in writing. So it’s very very similar to the last one, and very different – and hopefully I’m off to romance the world!"

Lily Allen said of her collaboration with Williams: "‘Dream A Little Dream’ is one of my favourite songs of all time so I didn’t hesitate when Robbie asked me if I’d like to duet with him on it. I was a bit nervous when we recorded it, especially when I asked him what he wanted me to do and he said something like ‘just be you’. But I’m really happy with it and think we do justice to a classic song." Murs also commented on his first collaboration with his long-time friend: "I absolutely loved working with Rob on this album. After touring Europe with him this year it seemed only right that we record something together, and “I Wan’na Be Like You” is such a classic sing-a-long tune. It’s always brilliant when you get to work with your mates!" Wainwright also spoke of his duet with Williams: "Working with Robbie is a dream come true. I’m once again the envy of both sexes. Robbie is the real deal, full package, a total mensch and if I could come up with any more paired descriptive sayings I would use them as well."

Singles
"Go Gentle" was released as the album's official lead single on 10 November 2013.

The album's second single "Dream a Little Dream" was released on 13 December 2013.

"Shine My Shoes" was released as a promotional single on 12 September 2013, upon pre-orders of the album being made available. The track premiered on radio that morning, and shortly after an official audio stream was released to YouTube. It was released digitally as the third single from the album on 24 March 2014.

Chart performance
In the UK, the album opened at number one (which became the 1,000th UK number one album) with 109,000 copies sold. During its second week, Swings Both Ways dropped to number three, the following week the album climbed to number two, the following week the album climbed back to number one in its fourth week, selling 126,000 copies – an increase of 31% from the previous week. Williams secured the Christmas album number one with sales of 126,000 copies. The album was the fourth best-selling album of 2013 (excluding multi-artist compilations) with 626,000 copies sold for the year.

Critical reception

Swings Both Ways has received mixed to positive reviews from music critics. As of December 2013, the album holds an aggregate score of 58 out of 100 assigned by Metacritic, based on 7 reviews.

Track listing
All tracks produced by Guy Chambers, with the exception of "Wedding Bells" which was produced by Steve Power.

Charts

Weekly charts

Year-end charts

Decade-end charts

Certifications

Release history

References

2013 albums
Robbie Williams albums
Swing albums